Dehnow-e Sarfaryab (also Romanized as Dehnow-e Sarfāryāb; also known as Deh-e Now and Delī Deh-e Now) is a village in Sarfaryab Rural District, Sarfaryab District, Charam County, Kohgiluyeh and Boyer-Ahmad Province, Iran. At the 2006 census, its population was 93, in 23 families.

References 

Populated places in Charam County